North Gate University is a public university being constructed on the outskirts of Kigali in Rwanda. Its creation was approved by a legislative act in Rwandan parliament in 2011. It is being constructed to handle 10,000 students from across the East Africa region, and its capacity expected to increase to 50,000 in 15 years. Construction of the university is being funded partly by the oversubscribed Euro bond sale in Rwanda, donations from the East African community at large, the Africa Development Bank, the United Nations Development Programme, and USAID. The university's curriculum is being developed in collaboration with the University of Nairobi, University of Dar es Salaam, and Makerere University.

Campus
The campus will include education facilities, housing facilities for both faculty and staff and a forest. It will be connected by railway to Kigali and neighboring countries Tanzania and Burundi

The campus is basically divided into two parts. There is the University Centre where the library, departmental offices, examination centre and resource centre are located, consisting of lecture theaters, workshops, and labs; and a second half consisting of the resident halls, hostels, and a football field.

Faculties 
Faculty of Agriculture
Faculty of Veterinary Medicine
Institute of Anthropology
Institute of Diplomacy And International Studies
Institute of Nuclear Science & Technology
School of Medicine
School of Biological Sciences
School of Business
School of Continuing And Distance learning
School of Dental Sciences
School of Economics
School of Engineering
School of Mathematics
School of Nursing Sciences
School of Pharmacy
School of Physical Sciences
School of the Arts And Design
School of the Built Environment
Board of Post Graduate Studies
Center For International Programmes & Links

Housing and sports facilities
North Gate University upon completion will have ten halls of residence, four of which houses female students. Off-campus housing will be also encouraged as Kigali-Butare Township will be able to provide affordable alternate options. Transport will be provided by the school to and from Kigali where some students will reside. Off-campus accommodation near the school will be available as private developers are investing hugely near the school.

Campus meals will be served by the school mess and a few approved off-campus food joints. A multipurpose students' centre is also under construction for students to socialise, watch TV and play pool. Sports facilities will include rugby and football fields; volleyball courts, indoor and outdoor basketball and badminton courts; and a field hockey pitch.

References

External links

Universities in Rwanda